Eugene "Gus" Wilson (born 11 April 1963 in Manchester) is an English former professional football player and is now a football coach with extensive experience in the non-league game across north-west England.

Wilson started as a trainee at Manchester City like his older brother Clive Wilson.

In 1991, he joined Crewe Alexandra from Accrington Stanley, making a total of 115 appearances as a right-sided defender for the Railwaymen. His one League goal - in an away win at Aldershot on New Year's Day 1992 - was later wiped from the records when Aldershot went bust. He did however manage to score 3 other goals in Cup matches.

Wilson joined Hyde United F.C. in 1994, and in 2001 he moved to Radcliffe Borough.

After his playing career was over, Wilson moved into team management and coaching at various north-western clubs including Flixton, Winsford United, Glossop North End and F.C. United of Manchester.

References

External links

Living people
1963 births
Northwich Victoria F.C. players
Runcorn F.C. Halton players
Accrington Stanley F.C. players
Crewe Alexandra F.C. players
Hyde United F.C. players
Radcliffe F.C. players
Winsford United F.C. players
English Football League players
National League (English football) players
English footballers
Association football defenders